Cobalus is a genus of skippers in the family Hesperiidae.

Species
Recognised species in the genus Cobalus include:
 Cobalus fidicula (Hewitson, 1877)
 Cobalus virbius Cramer, 1777

Former species
Cobalus aethus Hayward, 1951 - transferred to Tricrista aethus (Hayward, 1951)
Cobalus arita Schaus, 1902 - transferred to Tigasis arita (Schaus, 1902)
Cobalus asella Herrich-Schäffer, 1869 - synonymized with Amblyscirtes alternata (Grote and Robinson, 1867)
Cobalus calvina (Hewitson, 1866) - transferred to Calvetta calvina (Hewitson, 1866)
Cobalus cannae Herrich-Schäffer, 1869 - transferred to Quinta cannae (Herrich-Schäffer, 1869)
Cobalus chrysophrys Mabille, 1891 - transferred to Mnasitheus chrysophrys (Mabille, 1891)
Cobalus cinnamomea Herrich-Schäffer, 1869 - transferred to Methionopsis cinnamomea (Herrich-Schäffer, 1869)
Cobalus columbaria Herrich-Schäffer, 1870 - transferred to Onophas columbaria (Herrich-Schäffer, 1870)
Cobalus corope Herrich-Schäffer, 1869 - transferred to Tigasis corope (Herrich-Schäffer, 1869)
Cobalus cristatus Bell, 1930 - transferred to Tricrista cristatus (Bell, 1930)
Cobalus discors Plötz, 1882 - transferred to Carystina discors (Plötz, 1882) 
Cobalus disjuncta Herrich-Schäffer, 1869 - synonymized with Dubiella dubius (Stoll, 1781)
Cobalus duplex Mabille, 1889 - synonymized with Prosopalpus debilis (Plötz, 1879)
Cobalus evanidus Mabille, 1883 - synonymized with Mnasilus allubita (Butler, 1877)
Cobalus gabina Godman, 1900 - transferred to Neoxeniades gabina (Godman, 1900)
Cobalus hypargyra Herrich-Schäffer, 1869 - transferred to Paracarystus hypargyra (Herrich-Schäffer, 1869)
Cobalus illudens Mabille, 1891 - synonymized with Vehilius stictomenes (Butler, 1877)
Cobalus ludens Mabille, 1891 - transferred to Ludens ludens (Mabille, 1891)
Cobalus lumina Herrich-Schäffer, 1869 - transferred to Cymaenes lumina (Herrich-Schäffer, 1869)
Cobalus lurida Herrich-Schäffer, 1869 - transferred to Lurida lurida (Herrich-Schäffer, 1869)
Cobalus mubevensis Bell, 1932 - transferred to Eutus mubevensis (Bell, 1932)
Cobalus quadrata Herrich-Schäffer, 1869 - transferred to Xeniades quadrata (Herrich-Schäffer, 1869)
Cobalus rastaca Schaus, 1902 - transferred to Eutus rastaca (Schaus, 1902)
Cobalus simplicissima Herrich-Schäffer, 1870 - transferred to Mnasalcas simplicissima (Herrich-Schäffer, 1870)
Cobalus stigmula Mabille, 1891 - synonymized with Contrastia distigma (Plötz, 1882)
Cobalus tertianus Herrich-Schäffer, 1869 - transferred to Mielkeus tertianus (Herrich-Schäffer, 1869)
Cobalus tripunctus Herrich-Schäffer, 1865 - transferred to Cymaenes tripunctus (Herrich-Schäffer, 1865)
Cobalus umbrosus Mabille, 1883 - synonymized with Mnasilus allubita (Butler, 1877)

References

Natural History Museum Lepidoptera genus database

Hesperiinae
Hesperiidae genera